Miss America 1976, the 49th Miss America pageant, was held at the Boardwalk Hall in Atlantic City, New Jersey on September 6, 1975, and broadcast on NBC.

The winner, Tawny Godin, representing New York, later became better known as Tawny Little, a television personality in Los Angeles who married actor John Schneider, star of the TV series The Dukes of Hazzard. She was the first woman with the title of Miss New York to take the crown, Bess Myerson having won the 1945 pageant entered as Miss New York City.

Result

Placements

Order of announcements

Top 10

Awards

Preliminary awards

Other awards

Judges
 Colonel Gilbert Mitchell
 Jeanne Meixell
 Frank DeFord
 Dorothy Alexander
 Joseph Campanella
 Lee Meriwether
 Don Galloway

Contestants

External links
 Miss America official website

1976
1976 beauty pageants
1975 in New Jersey
September 1975 events in the United States
Events in Atlantic City, New Jersey